St. Paul VI Catholic High School (known as PVI or Paul VI) is a Roman Catholic college preparatory school in Chantilly, Virginia, United States.

The school was previously located in southwest Fairfax, Virginia and is named after Pope Paul VI. In 2020 it relocated to Loudoun County, specifically Chantilly, Virginia.

It competes in the Washington Catholic Athletic Conference and Virginia Independent State Athletic Association (VISAA) and has a high-profile athletic rivalry with Bishop O'Connell High School in Arlington.

Paul VI opened for the 1983–84 school year, accepting freshmen and sophomore students only. The next year (1984–85), the school was open to freshmen through juniors, and 1985–86 saw the first senior class. The Diocese of Arlington purchased the school building, which was in a dilapidated condition, from George Mason University, which had owned it for about a decade. The structure had originally been Fairfax High School, which opened in 1935 and relocated to a new facility in January 1972. One wing of the building housed Alzheimer patients until the school's third year.

During its first years, the school was ministered by five Oblates of St. Francis de Sales, who also taught classes and one of whom (Rev. Donald Heet, OSFS) served as the principal. The remainder of the faculty were lay teachers. The other ordained faculty were Rev. Robert Mulligan, OSFS and Rev. John Lyle, OSFS. In 2000, the school selected its first principal who was not from the Oblate order. Mr. Philip Robey was selected for this position, and stepped down seven years later. He was replaced by Mrs. Virginia Colwell, a former English teacher at Paul VI.

In 2020, the high school relocated to the South Riding area in Loudoun County, amid the COVID-19 pandemic. The move had been planned prior to the pandemic.

The team name "Panthers" was voted by the student body during the school's first year. The original school colors were brown and gold until the 1999–2000 school year. The school moved away from brown in favor of black, which was considered more stylish by the student body.

After the canonization of Pope Paul VI in October 2018, the school was renamed St. Paul VI Catholic High School to further honor its patron and namesake.

2001–2003 expansion
On May 9, 2001, Bishop Paul Loverde of the Diocese of Arlington led a group of civic and school officials at the groundbreaking for a $6.5 million student activity center. It included a gathering space for the entire student body, three classrooms, a gymnasium, locker rooms, a weight room, a movable stage used for athletic and stage equipment, offices, laundry facilities, and a concession stand.

The expansion was the result of five years of planning and fundraising by the school to refurbish its grounds. After a generous grant from the Diocese of Arlington, school officials were able to make some needed repairs to the old building. Before actual construction began on the activity center in the winter of 2001, air conditioning was installed in the current building, and the original locker rooms were torn down.

The two-story addition was completed for the 2003–04 school year. This included the new gymnasium, locker rooms, computer lab, coaches' offices, and a wrestling room.

Academics
Courses are offered on five levels with the exception of theology, social science, electives and required computer courses. The average number of academic courses a student takes per semester is 7 (minimum is 6; maximum is 8).  Honors, Advanced Placement, and Dual Enrollment courses have restricted enrollment based on qualifying scores on placement tests, subject area grades, cumulative GPA, and teacher recommendation.  

Advanced Placement Courses (25) are effectively reserved for juniors and seniors; exceptional sophomores may be eligible. Students enrolled in any AP class are required to take the AP exam.  • Calculus AB • Calculus BC • Chemistry • Chinese Language & Culture •  Comparative Government & Politics • Computer Science A • Computer Science Principles •  Drawing • English Language and Composition • English Literature and Composition • European History • French Language & Culture •  Human Geography • Latin • Macroeconomics • Physics 1, 2, & C • Psychology •  Research •  Seminar  • Spanish Language & Culture • Statistics • United States Government & Politics • United States History   

Dual Enrollment Courses (27) are available to juniors and seniors capable of college level courses through Northern Virginia Community College (NVCC). Students must meet the entrance test requirements set by NVCC. The school considers dual enrollment courses to be equal in rigor to AP and weighs them accordingly.  DE courses taught at Paul VI this year are:   •  Acting (CST 131, 132)  •  Beginning Chinese (CHI 101, 102) •  Beginning German (GER 101, 102) •  Biology with Lab (BIO 101, 102) •  Chemistry (CHM 111, 112) • College Composition (ENG 111, 112) • Environmental Science     (ENV 121, 122) • Fundamentals of Design 1 (ART 131) •  Genetics (BIO 256) •  Human Anatomy & Physiology    (BIO 141, 142) • Intermediate Chinese (CHI 201, 202) • Intermediate German (GER 201, 202) • Intermediate Spanish (SPA 201, 202) •  Microbiology (BIO 205) • US History II (HIS 122) •  Theatre (CST 130)   Honors Courses (31) are for students capable of advanced learning and independent work.  • Computer Science • Engineering • English • Fine Arts • Mathematics • Science • Social Studies • World Language (Levels 2 - 5)  

College Prep Courses are designed to develop skills and knowledge needed to succeed in higher education.  General Courses offer differential instruction in a smaller class size.   

Through Project Lead the Way, students can elect to take Introduction to Engineering and Principles of Engineering, to explore a range of engineering topics and to build problem solving skills, critical thinking, and creativity.  Directed Independent Study provides an opportunity for qualified and approved students to pursue a project of interest beyond the normal curricular requirements, under the aegis of a faculty advisor. 

Faculty with advanced degrees: 55 master's degrees, 4 PhD, 1 MD, 1 CPA

Academic facts:
 98% of the Class of 2022 are attending post-secondary educational institutions; of these, 96% attend four-year colleges and 2% attend two-year colleges. Since the Class of 2009, the average percentage of students enrolled in college the first year after high school who returned for a second year (freshman to sophomore persistence) is 96%. 
 Paul VI was named one of the Top 50 Catholic High Schools in the U.S. by the Cardinal Newman Society. 
 PVI has implemented a school-wide initiative to integrate technology into the curriculum; all students use individual laptops in their courses.
 The average teaching experience of a PVI teacher is 16.7 years. 
 Over the past 5 years, we have numerically bench-marked our college acceptance rate and we have a virtually 100% acceptance rate when compared with like students in other private and public schools.
 Our persistence rate for the past 5 years has been 97% for students returning to college after their freshman year.
 AP scores of PVI students have exceeded the averages for Fairfax County Public Schools in each of the past 10 years.
 All students have the opportunity to earn an Advanced Diploma, with 69% of our student graduating with honors in the Class of 2022.
 PVI is an innovative leader in the area of academic support, with numerous formal programs including the Academic Center for Excellence and the DeSales Center.
 Receiving the sacrament is a way of life, with optional daily Mass before school and during 8th period, and a monthly school-wide Mass in our student center. Opportunity for Eucharistic Adoration and Confession is offered every week.
 Students take a single, specifically selected Theology course each year to learn and apply their Catholic faith. All students are required to make a retreat by the end of their junior year. Personal and group service projects are integral to the PVI student experience.
 Our College & Career Specialist helps guide our students with important decisions for the future. Our annual Career Day hosts over 80 professionals who share their experience and advice with juniors and seniors.
 PVI offers over 3 million dollars yearly in financial assistance and scholarships and over 40% receive some sort of assistance.
 The graduating Class of 2022 received over $20 million in college scholarship offers.
 Paul VI was named one of the Top 50 Catholic schools in the nation by the Cardinal Newman Society in 2013.
 In 2014, Paul VI was named to the Catholic Education Honor Roll by the Cardinal Newman Society. Fewer than 5% of Catholic high schools in the U.S. made the honor roll in 2014, numbering 71 schools (up from 50 the previous year).
 In 2013 it was chosen by the editors of Virginia Living magazine as a 2013 Top Virginia School.
 In 2014, Paul VI was named Best Private High School in the Best of Suburbia poll by Posh Seven Magazine.

Athletics

Paul VI's athletic teams compete in the Washington Catholic Athletic Conference (WCAC) and the Virginia Independent State Athletic Association (VISAA).

Basketball

The Paul VI basketball team won the Washington Catholic Athletic Conference boys' basketball championship in 2012. They did not lose a game in conference play, winning 21 consecutive conference games. No other team in the history of the WCAC has had an undefeated season while winning 21 games. The WCAC is widely regarded as the best high school basketball conference in the country.

Both the boys' and girls' basketball teams won the WCAC title in 2014. The boys' team also won the Virginia Independent Schools Athletic Association championship and the Alhambra championship for 2014. The boys' team won again in 2018 and again in 2022. The girls' team has won the Virginia Independent Schools Athletic Association championship every year since 2002.

Baseball
The baseball program at Paul VI had a record of 121–32 and seven championship titles between 2004 and 2008. Paul VI baseball also competes for the Virginia Independent Schools Athletic Association (VISAA) State Championship at the end of each season. The VISAA State Tournament includes the top eight private school baseball teams in the State of Virginia.

The Panthers were ranked as No. 6 in the nation by USA Today in 2008 and ranked as No. 3 by Rise Magazine. They finished the 2008 season with a record of 27–3, won the Southeastern Baseball Classic Championship, the VISAA State Championship and ended the year ranked 12th in America by several publications.

Former coach Billy Emerson had an overall record of 138–44 upon arriving in 2003. He was named coach of the year several times by the Washington Post, and Washington Examiner, as well as coach of the year in the WCAC and the VISAA. In 2008, he was also named Mid-Atlantic Coach of the Year by the National H.S. Baseball Coaches Association and was one of eight finalists for National H.S. Coach of the year. Emerson stepped down to focus on being Paul VI Athletic Director. Emerson has since returned as coach.

2004: (17–12) Regular season: 2nd place in the WCAC South – post-season: WCAC Tournament Quarterfinalists, VISAA State Champions

2005: (26–5) Regular season: WCAC South Champs – postseason: WCAC Tournament finalists, VISAA State Semifinalists (nationally ranked as high as No. 17)

2006: (24–8) Regular season: 3rd place in the WCAC (north–south divisions no longer in place) – postseason: WCAC Tournament Finalists, VISAA State Finalists

2007: (27–4) Regular season: 1st place in the WCAC – postseason: WCAC Tournament Champs, VISAA State Semifinalists (nationally ranked as high as No. 41)

2008: (27–3) Regular season: 1st place in the WCAC Southeastern Baseball Classic Champs - postseason: WCAC Tournament Semifinalists, VISAA State Champions (nationally ranked as high as No. 3)

Football
1999 WCAC Varsity Football Champions

Boys Soccer
2010 Virginia State Champs (VISAA)

2015 Virginia State Champs (VISAA)

Boys lacrosse 
The PVI men's lacrosse program made its first appearance in both the State Championship and WCAC Championship games in 2013. In 2014, professional lacrosse player Steven Brooks became offensive coordinator. The lacrosse program has made a final four every year since 2013. Since 2013, the men's lacrosse program has been ranked in the top 25 three different times and has stayed in the top 50. In 2018, the team won its first Virginia Independent Schools Athletic Association (VISAA) Division I boys' lacrosse State Championship.

Girls soccer 
On November 5, 2016, the Lady Panthers took home the Washington Catholic Athletic Association (WCAC) Girls Varsity Soccer title for the first time since 1993, when the league was named the "Catholic Girls Athletic Association".

Other sports
Athletics at the school include cross country, golf (co-ed), ice hockey (co-ed), swimming and diving, tennis (boys and girls), indoor track (winter), track and field, wrestling, volleyball (boys and girls), field hockey, cheerleading, dance team, softball, Special Olympics soccer, basketball.

Scandal
There was a high-profile scandal at PVI in 1999 when it was discovered that 16-year-old student Jonathan Taylor Spielberg, who claimed to be Steven Spielberg's nephew, was actually Anoushirvan Fakhran, a 27-year-old pornographic actor from Tehran, Iran. After repeated truancy by Fakhran, school officials contacted DreamWorks to see if Spielberg had any information about his "nephew". When it was discovered that Spielberg only had nieces, a police investigation followed. Fakhran was arrested and later pleaded guilty to forgery. Fakhran was sentenced to two years and eleven months of probation, was ordered to perform 100 hours of community service, and was barred from having contact with minors.

Notable alumni

 Marcus Derrickson – college basketball player for Georgetown University
 Erick Green (born 1991), basketball player in the Israeli Basketball Premier League, former player for the Denver Nuggets, class of 2009
 VJ King – college basketball player for the University of Louisville
 Josh Reaves – college basketball player for Penn State
 Jeremy Roach – college basketball player for Duke University

References

External links
 Paul VI High School official website
 PVI Baseball website
 Washington Catholic Athletic Conference official website

Catholic secondary schools in Virginia
Fairfax, Virginia
Educational institutions established in 1983
1983 establishments in Virginia
Roman Catholic Diocese of Arlington